Rush week may refer to:

Rush week, a recruitment process used in college fraternities and sororities.
Rush Week, a 1988 slasher film